(also known as ) is a set of execution startup routines linked into a C program that performs any initialization work required before calling the program's main function.

Form and usage
Crt0 generally takes the form of an object file called , often written in assembly language, which is automatically included by the linker into every executable file it builds.

 contains the most basic parts of the runtime library. As such, the exact work it performs depends on the program's compiler, operating system and C standard library implementation. Beside the initialization work required by the environment and toolchain,  can perform additional operations defined by the programmer, such as executing C++ global constructors and C functions carrying GCC's  attribute.

"crt" stands for "C runtime", and the zero stands for "the very beginning".

Example crt0.s 
This example is for Linux x86-64 with AT&T syntax, without an actual C runtime.
.text

.globl _start

_start: # _start is the entry point known to the linker
    xor %ebp, %ebp            # effectively RBP := 0, mark the end of stack frames
    mov (%rsp), %edi          # get argc from the stack (implicitly zero-extended to 64-bit)
    lea 8(%rsp), %rsi         # take the address of argv from the stack
    lea 16(%rsp,%rdi,8), %rdx # take the address of envp from the stack
    xor %eax, %eax            # per ABI and compatibility with icc
    call main                 # %edi, %rsi, %rdx are the three args (of which first two are C standard) to main

    mov %eax, %edi    # transfer the return of main to the first argument of _exit
    xor %eax, %eax    # per ABI and compatibility with icc
    call _exit        # terminate the program

See also 

 Entry point
 Runtime system

References

External links 
 crt0.o vs crt1.o
 Linux x86 program start-up
 Hello from a libc-free world! (Part 1), March 16, 2010
 glibc x86_64 start.S  

C standard library
C programming language family